Shawkat Momen Shahjahan was a Bangladesh Awami League politician and a Member of Parliament.

Early life
Shajahan was born in 1951. He studied at the Bangladesh Agriculture University in Mymensingh. He worked as a lecturer in Bangladesh Agriculture University after graduating.

Career
Shahjahan was elected to Parliament in 1986 Tangail-8 as a Bangladesh Awami League candidate. He won the by-poll in 1999 from Tangail-8 and was re-elected again in December 2008 General elections. He served as the Chairman of the Parliamentary Standing Committee for Agriculture Ministry. He was elected unopposed in the 10th parliamentary election on 5 January 2014. He has called on the government of Bangladesh to implement the Chittagong Hill Tracts Peace Accord to avert violence in the Chittagong Hill Tracts region.

Death and legacy
Shahjahan died on 20 January 2014. His constituency, Tangail-8, fail vacant after his death. On 29 March 2014, by-elections were held and his son, Anupam Shahjahan Joy, was elected to Parliament.

References

Awami League politicians
1951 births
2014 deaths
7th Jatiya Sangsad members
3rd Jatiya Sangsad members
9th Jatiya Sangsad members
10th Jatiya Sangsad members